Johnsburg, Wisconsin is an unincorporated community in the Town of Calumet in Fond du Lac County, Wisconsin. Johnsburg is part of the Holyland region in northeastern Fond du Lac county.

Church / history
St. John the Baptist Catholic Church is a prominent building in Johnsburg. It is listed on the National Register of Historic Places as number 80000137.

The congregation was founded by six families in 1841. When built in 1842, the church was the first in the approximately 100 miles (160 kilometers) between Milwaukee and Green Bay. Named after the church, St. Johannes Gemeinde (St. John's congregation), the community was known as Hinesburg. Father Deisenrieder had a post office established and the town received its original name to honor his birthplace in Bavaria. The United States Postal Service changed their methods in 1885 and the community was renamed "Johnsburg".

Notable people
Evan Vogds, football player

Images

Sources
St. John the Baptist Congregation, Rev. Benjamin J. Blied, 1980

References

Unincorporated communities in Wisconsin
Unincorporated communities in Fond du Lac County, Wisconsin
Populated places established in 1841
1841 establishments in Wisconsin Territory